is a Japanese ice sledge hockey player. He was part of the Japanese sledge hockey team that won a silver medal at the 2010 Winter Paralympics.

His lower legs were amputated following an elevator accident in 1992.

References

External links 
 

1970 births
Living people
Japanese sledge hockey players
Paralympic sledge hockey players of Japan
Paralympic silver medalists for Japan
Ice sledge hockey players at the 2002 Winter Paralympics
Ice sledge hockey players at the 2006 Winter Paralympics
Ice sledge hockey players at the 2010 Winter Paralympics
Para ice hockey players at the 2018 Winter Paralympics
Medalists at the 2010 Winter Paralympics
People from Tomakomai, Hokkaido
Japanese amputees
Paralympic medalists in sledge hockey